Jamba is a town and a  municipality, with a population of 105,090 (2014 census), in the province of Huíla, Angola.

Administrative subdivisions
The municipality of Jamba comprises three communes as follows
 Jamba, the seat of the municipality
 Cassinga
 Dongo

Transport

Rail 
Jamba is served by the terminus of a short branch railway of the southern line of the national railway system.

Air 
There is an airport in Jamba, .

See also 
 Jamba, Cuando Cubango
 Railway stations in Angola

References

Populated places in Huíla Province
Municipalities of Angola